SS Walter L. Fleming was a Liberty ship built in the United States during World War II. She was named after Walter L. Fleming, American Civil War historian and Dean of the Vanderbilt University College of Arts and Science in 1923, and later Director of the Graduate School.

Construction
Walter L. Fleming was laid down on 31 October 1943, under a Maritime Commission (MARCOM) contract, MC hull 1542, by J.A. Jones Construction, Panama City, Florida; she was launched on 7 December 1943.

History
She was allocated to Waterman Steamship Corp., on 30 January 1944. On 24 May 1946, she was laid up in the National Defense Reserve Fleet, in the James River Group, Lee Hall, Virginia. On 15 September 1959, she was sold, along with nine other ships, for $717,810 to Bethlehem Steel, for scrapping. She was withdrawn from the fleet on 28 September 1959.

References

Bibliography

 
 
 
 
 

 

Liberty ships
Ships built in Panama City, Florida
1944 ships
James River Reserve Fleet